Psychodynamic psychotherapy (or psychodynamic therapy) and psychoanalytic psychotherapy (or psychoanalytic therapy) are two categories of psychological therapies. Their main purpose is revealing the unconscious content of a client's psyche in an effort to alleviate psychic tension, which is  inner conflict within the mind that was created in a situation of extreme stress or emotional hardship, often in the state of distress. The terms "psychoanalytic psychotherapy" and "psychodynamic psychotherapy" are often used interchangeably, but a distinction can be made in practice: though psychodynamic psychotherapy largely relies on psychoanalytical theory, it employs substantially shorter treatment periods than traditional psychoanalytical therapies.

Psychodynamic psychotherapy relies on the interpersonal relationship between client and therapist more than other forms of depth psychology. They must have a strong relationship built heavily on trust. In terms of approach, this form of therapy uses psychoanalysis adapted to a less intensive style of working, usually at a frequency of once or twice per week,  often the same frequency as many other therapies. Principal theorists drawn upon are Freud, Klein, and theorists of the object relations movement, e.g., Winnicott, Guntrip, and Bion. Some psychodynamic therapists also draw on Jung, Lacan, or Langs. It is a focus that has been used in individual psychotherapy, group psychotherapy, family therapy, and to understand and work with institutional and organizational contexts. In psychiatry, it has been used for adjustment disorders as well as post-traumatic stress disorder (PTSD), but more often for personality-related disorders.

History
The principles of psychodynamics were introduced in the 1874 publication Lectures on Physiology by German physician and physiologist Ernst Wilhelm von Brücke. Von Brücke, taking a cue from thermodynamics, suggested all living organisms are energy systems, governed by the principle of energy conservation. During the same year, von Brücke was supervisor to first-year medical student Sigmund Freud at the University of Vienna. Freud later adopted this new construct of "dynamic" physiology to aid in his own conceptualization of the human psyche. Later, both the concept and application of psychodynamics were further developed by the likes of Carl Jung, Alfred Adler, Otto Rank, and Melanie Klein. Psychodynamic therapy has evolved from psychoanalytic theory, with some later modifications in the therapeutic practice experienced since the mid-20th century.

Approaches
Most psychodynamic approaches are centered on the concept that some maladaptive functioning is in play, and that this maladaption is, at least in part, unconscious. The presumed maladaption develops early in life and eventually causes difficulties in day-to-day life. Psychodynamic therapies focus on revealing and resolving these unconscious conflicts that are driving their symptoms.

Major techniques used by psychodynamic therapists include:

 Free association: The client is encouraged to communicate their true feelings and thoughts to the therapist. This is done with the client knowing it is a safe space and done without judgment and/ or consequence. These thoughts and/ or responses could possibly be irrelevant, illogical, and embarrassing to the patient. This is to help access unconscious information, memories, or impulses that the patient might otherwise have not been able to bring to the surface. After being brought to the conscious mind they can then be interpreted.
 Dream interpretation: (also known as dream analysis) The client keeps a record of their dreams, and communicates or relays them to the therapist, sometimes aided by free association, and then the content is analyzed or interpreted  for hidden meanings, underlying motivations, and other portrayals.
 Recognizing resistance: This could be in many forms with slight variations depending on the type of resistance. The clients withstanding or withholding information for their better help and interpretation. Often the client could be using this a defense. This could be categorized in three different types of resistance.

The first type of resistance is conscious resistance, where the client is deliberate about not communicating the information needed because of distrust in the system, therapist, shame or rejection of the interpreter.

The second, repression resistance, also referred to as ego resistance, is used by the client to keep unacceptable thoughts, feelings, actions, and/ or impulses in the unconscious. This could be done by the patient blocking thoughts and communications during free associations, not remembering events.

The third, id resistance, is unlike the other two because it arises from the unconscious and is driven by id impulse. It resists change or treatment to further repeat the trauma in different situations, known as repetition compulsion. Additionally, there may be transference of views, feelings, and/or wishes of the patient onto the analyst, often the therapist, that were initially directed towards other impactful individuals in the patient's life. This is often people in early childhood such as parents, siblings, or other important people. By addressing these projected views it is hoped to help the patient reexperience, address, and analyze the effects; and to resolve current distress it could be causing. As in some psychoanalytic approaches, the therapeutic relationship is seen as a key means to understanding and working through the relational difficulties which the client has suffered in life.

Core principles and characteristics
Although psychodynamic psychotherapy can take many forms, commonalities include:
 An emphasis on the centrality of intrapsychic and unconscious conflicts, and their relation to development;
 Identifying defenses as developing in internal psychic structures in order to avoid unpleasant consequences of conflict;
 A belief that psychopathology develops especially from early childhood experiences;
 A view that internal representations of experiences are organized around interpersonal relations;
 A conviction that life issues and dynamics will re-emerge in the context of the client-therapist relationship as transference and counter-transference;
 Use of free association as a major method for exploration of internal conflicts and problems;
 Focusing on interpretations of transference, defense mechanisms, and current symptoms and the working through of these present problems;
 Trust in insight as critically important for success in therapy.

Efficacy
Psychodynamic psychotherapy is an evidence-based therapy and its more intensive form, psychoanalysis is also evidence-based. Later meta-analyses showed psychoanalysis and psychodynamic therapy to be effective, with outcomes comparable or greater than other kinds of psychotherapy or antidepressant drugs, but these arguments have also been subjected to various criticisms. For example, meta-analyses in 2012 and 2013 came to the conclusion that there is little support or evidence for the efficacy of psychoanalytic therapy, thus further research is needed.

A systematic review of Long Term Psychodynamic Psychotherapy (LTPP) in 2009 found an overall effect size of 0.33. Others have found effect sizes of 0.44–0.68.

Meta-analyses of Short Term Psychodynamic Psychotherapy (STPP) have found effect sizes ranging from 0.34 to 0.71 compared to no treatment and was found to be slightly better than other therapies in follow up. Other reviews have found an effect size of 0.78–0.91 for somatic disorders compared to no treatment  and 0.69 for treating depression. A 2012 meta-analysis by the Harvard Review of Psychiatry of Intensive Short-Term Dynamic Psychotherapy (ISTDP) found effect sizes ranging from 0.84 for interpersonal problems to 1.51 for depression. Overall ISTDP had an effect size of 1.18 compared to no treatment.

In 2011, a study published in the American Journal of Psychiatry made 103 comparisons between psychodynamic treatment and a non-dynamic competitor and found that 6 were superior, 5 were inferior, 28 had no difference and 63 were adequate. The study found that this could be used as a basis "to make psychodynamic psychotherapy an "empirically validated" treatment." In 2017, a meta-analysis of randomized controlled trials found psychodynamic therapy to be as efficacious as other therapies, including cognitive behavioral therapy.

Client-therapist relationship
Because of the subjectivity of each patient's potential psychological ailments, there is rarely a clear-cut treatment approach. Most often, therapists vary general approaches in order to best fit a patient's specific needs. If a therapist does not understand the psychological ailments of their patient extremely well, then it is unlikely that they are able to decide upon a treatment structure that will help the patient. Therefore, the patient-therapist relationship must be extremely strong.

Therapists encourage their patients to be as open and honest as possible. Patients must trust their therapist if this is to happen. Because the effectiveness of treatment relies so heavily on the patient giving information to their therapist, the patient-therapist relationship is more vital to psychodynamic therapy than almost every other type of medical practice.

See also
 Anna Freud
 Malan triangles
 Models of abnormality
 Psychodynamic Diagnostic Manual

References

 
Psychodynamics
Psychotherapies